Syed Abdul Malik (1919–2000) was an Indian writer of Assamese literature, from the village of Nahoroni in Golaghat. He was the president of Asam Sahitya Sabha in 1977 held at Abhayapuri.

Malik received many prizes, including Padmashri, Padma Bhusan, Sahitya Akademi Award, Sankar Dev Award, Xahityacharyya, etc. Malik won Sahitya Akademi Award in 1972 for his novel Aghari Atmar Kahini (Tale of a Nomadic Soul).

He died on 20 December 2000.

Literary work 
A) Novels

 Umola Ghoror Dhuli ( উমলা ঘৰৰ ধূলি) First Printed in "Baahi" Magazine in 1945-46 As Lo. Kha. Gu 
 BonJui (বনজুই) 1958
 Kobitar Naam Labha ( কবিতাৰ নাম লাভা) 1956
 Doctor Arunabhar Ohompurna Jibony ( ড: অৰুণাভৰ অসম্পূৰ্ণ জীৱনী) 1975
 Sobighar(ছবি ঘৰ) 1959
 Rothor Chokori Ghure ( ৰথৰ চকৰি ঘূৰে) 1958
 Matir Chaki ( মাটিৰ চাকি) 1959
 Konthahar ( কণ্ঠহাৰ) 1960
 Shurujmukhir Shapna(সুৰুযমুখীৰ স্বপ্ন) 1960
 Jia Jurir Ghat ( জীয়া-জুৰিৰ-ঘাট) 1960
 Onnyo Aakakh Onnyo Tora ( অন্য আকাশ অন্য তৰা) 1962
 Adharshila (আধাৰশিলা) 1966
 Mur babe Nuruba Maloti full ( মোৰ বাবে নোৰুবা মালতী ফুল) 1966
 Rajanighondhar Chakulu ( ৰজনীগন্ধাৰ চকুলো) 1964
 Prachir Aaru Prantor (প্ৰাচীৰ আৰু প্ৰান্তৰ) 1968
 Trishul ( ত্ৰিশূল ) 1968
 Aghari Atmar Kahini (অঘৰী আত্মাৰ কাহিনী) 
 Bih Metekar Full ( বিহ মেটেকাৰ ফুল) 1969
 Onnya Naam Mritu ( অন্য নাম মৃত্যু ) 1970
 Wilson, Aronya aaru moi ( উইলচন অৰণ্য আৰু মই)
 Omor maaya ( অমৰ মায়া) 1970
 Joya , Monika Ittadi ( জয়া মনিকা ইত্যাদি) 1968
 Khura Nidan ( খোৰা নিদান) 1971
 Ognighorbha ( অগ্নিগৰ্ভা ) 1971
 Uaihaafolu (উইহাফলো) 1971
 Hunali Hutare Bondha (সোণালী সূতাৰে বন্ধা) 1972
 Hipare Pran Samudra ( সিপাৰে প্ৰাণসমুদ্ৰ) 1972
 Dukmukali (দোকমোকালি) 
 Eta Surjya, Dukhon Nodi, Ekhon Morubhumi ( এটা সূৰ্য্য দুখন নদী এখন মৰুভূমি ) 1972 
 Pransamudra (প্ৰাণসমুদ্ৰ) 1972
 Pahumora Habir Baat ( পহুমৰা হাবিৰ বাট) 1973
 Jetuka Paator Dore ( জেতুকা পাতৰ দৰে) 1973
 Nool, Birina Khagori ( নল - বিৰিনা - খাগৰি ) 1973
 Mon Jetukar Paat ( মন জেতুকাৰ পাত) 1973
 Ekabeka Bittya (একাবেকা বৃত্ত) 1975  
 Harirot Ekura Jui (শৰীৰত একুৰা জুই ) 1970
 Mou Dimorur Kukh (মৌ ডিমৰুৰ কোহ)  1985 
 Rupaborir Polokh (ৰূপাবৰিৰ পলস 1980)  
 Fagunor Hekh Haahi (ফাগুনৰ শেষ হাঁহি)  1984  
 Godya, Podya, aaru Firingoti_
 Nihonga Moupiyar Geet 1985
 Kebol Premerei Jodi  1985
 Shapnabhonga 1985
 Eta Dhumketur Horshojya1987
 Humeru, Kumeru aaru Eta Baahi 
 Raatir Kobita
 Dhanya Nar Tanu Bhal (ধন্য নৰ তনু ভাল)
 OnnyaJug Bhinnya Tirtha
 Bhumichompar Kopalot Henduror Fut
 Swaty Nokhyatror Bhosma
 Gathonit Tezor Koraal
 Ubhoti Ohar Gaan
 Bondar, Kamiz, Beloon
 Sotyaar Pothere Shantir Rothore Muktir Joijaatra
 Monushyatar Morihalit
 Monichunir Choka Chomka
 Fulonibaarir Brajrapat
 Moi Morinu Nejau Kiyo
 Nijorar Bukut Jola Juir Shikha
 Duborir Paatot Niyoror Tupal
 AApun Aapun Swarga
 Prem Amritor Nodi
 Ruptirthar Yatri (ৰূপতীৰ্থৰ যাত্ৰী)
 Moromor Mojiar Heujia Dubori
 Baalir Bukur Hunor Chekura
 Mou Mitha Hridoyor Bhakha 2000 
 Okhoy Obbyoy Smriti
 Oronya Debota
 Hunaali Aandhar
 Smritirekha
 Bohut Bedona Etupa Chakulu
 Moi Prostab Koru Je

B) Story Collections

 Parashmoni (পৰশমনি)
 Rajanigondhar sokulo(ৰজনীগন্ধাৰ চকুলো)
 Ronga gora(ৰঙাগৰা)
 Ejoni Notun Chuwali
 Moroha Papori
 Morom Morom Lage 
 Hil Aaru Hikha 
 Hikhore Hikhore
 Osthayi Aaru Ontora 
 Choy Nombor Proshnor Uttar
 Andhakup
 Bibshya Bedona
 Aabortya
 Tinichokiya Garhi
 Pura Gaout Pohila Bohag
 Pranadhika 
 Hahi AAru Chokulu
 Mriganabhi
 Arihona
 Hahire Chokulu Dhaki
 Ekhon Nilikha Chithi 
 Alankar
 Chai aaru Firingani 

He wrote two thousand short stories in the Assamese Language.

C) Poetry books
 Shakhar(স্বাক্ষৰ)
 Chandahin Chanda (ছন্দহীন ছন্দ)
 Beduin (বেদুইন)

D) Song Books 
 Tumar Kantho Mor Kotha (তোমাৰ কণ্ঠ মোৰ কথা )

References

External links
 Renowned Litterateur Syed Abdul Malik Remembered
 

Asom Sahitya Sabha Presidents
1919 births
Poets from Assam
Assamese-language poets
2000 deaths
Recipients of the Sahitya Akademi Award in Assamese
Recipients of the Padma Bhushan in literature & education
Recipients of the Padma Shri in literature & education
People from Golaghat district
Recipients of the Assam Valley Literary Award
20th-century Indian poets
Novelists from Assam
Dramatists and playwrights from Assam